The 1995 Valencia Open was an Association of Tennis Professionals tennis tournament held in Valencia, Spain and played on outdoor clay courts. It was the inaugural edition of the tournament which was held from 2 October until 9 October 1995 and was part of the ATP World Series of the 1995 ATP Tour. Unseeded Sjeng Schalken won the singles title.

Finals

Singles

 Sjeng Schalken defeated  Gilbert Schaller 6–4, 6–2
 It was Schalken's first singles title of his career.

Doubles

 Tomás Carbonell /  Francisco Roig defeated  Tom Kempers /  Jack Waite 7–5, 6–3
 It was Carbonell's 4th title of the year and the 16th of his career. It was Roig's 4th title of the year and the 8th of his career.

References

External links 
 ITF tournament edition details

 
Valencia Open
Valencia Open